Crepidula maculosa is a species of sea snail, a marine gastropod mollusk in the family Calyptraeidae, the slipper snails or slipper limpets, cup-and-saucer snails, and Chinese hat snails.

Distribution

Description
The maximum recorded shell length is 35 mm.

Habitat
Minimum recorded depth is 0 m. Maximum recorded depth is 11 m.

References

External links

Calyptraeidae
Gastropods described in 1846